The first Glastonbury Festivals, most notable for being the forerunners of Glastonbury Festival, were a series of cultural events founded by communist activist and composer Rutland Boughton, which were held in summer from 1914 to 1925 in Glastonbury, Somerset, England.

Despite being an initial success, public support and financing for the festivals was lost after Boughton joined the Communist Party of Great Britain (CPGB), supported the miners during the 1926 United Kingdom general strike, and performed a nativity opera (Bethlehem) depicting Jesus as the son of a miner and King Herod as a capitalist.

History
The festivals were founded by English socialist composer Rutland Boughton and his librettist Reginald Buckley. Apart from the founding of a national theatre, they envisaged a summer school and music festival based on utopian principles.  This was inspired at least in part by the concept of the "temple theatre" first proposed by Richard Wagner and its corresponding festival, Bayreuth: a place for the common people to congregate around art. With strong Arthurian connections and historic and prehistoric associations, Glastonbury was chosen to host the festivals. The agricultural setting was also considered an asset as Boughton and Buckley felt that 'real art can only grow out of real life." Among the supporters were Sir Edward Elgar and George Bernard Shaw, while financial support was received from the Clark family, shoemakers in nearby Street. The first festival included the premiere performance of Boughton's opera The Immortal Hour. By the time the festivals ended in 1926, 350 staged works had been performed, as well as a programme of chamber music, lectures and recitals.

Demise 
The festivals ended ignominiously when Boughton's backers withdrew funds following a scandalous production of his Nativity opera Bethlehem in London. In sympathy with the miners and the ongoing General Strike, the production had Jesus born in a miner's cottage with King Herod as a top-hatted capitalist and his soldiers in police uniforms. The demise of the festival was also hastened once it became public knowledge that Boughton had joined the Communist Party of Great Britain (CPGB), losing him the support of many wealthy supporters.

References 

British music history
20th century in music
Arts festivals in England
History of Somerset
1910s in British music
1910s in England
1920s in British music
1920s in England
Glastonbury
Festivals in Somerset
20th century in Somerset